The New Castle (Neues Schloss) is a nineteenth century palace in Hechingen in Germany. It served as the city residence for princes of the House of Hohenzollern-Hechingen.

History
The first building on the site was a Renaissance-style residence built by Eitel Frederick IV, Count of Hohenzollern in the late 16th century. Apart from a few minor remnants, it was demolished by Friedrich Hermann Otto at the start of the 19th century to make way for the three-wing present structure, built between 1818 and 1819, designed by Rudolf Burnitz and funded by French reparations from the Congress of Vienna. Burnitz was a pupil of Friedrich Weinbrenner, a leading neo-classical architect in the Grand Duchy of Baden. The castle remained unfinished, since the principality was in debt and the funds for its construction ran out.

Bibliography
 Friedrich Hossfeld und Hans Vogel: Die Kunstdenkmäler Hohenzollerns, Bd. 1: Kreis Hechingen. Holzinger, Hechingen 1939, S. 186 ff. 
 Wulf Schirmer (Hrsg.): Friedrich Weinbrenner und die Weinbrenner-Schule, Bd. 1: Die barocke Stadtplanung und die ersten klassizistischen Entwürfe Weinbrenners. Müller, Karlsruhe 1996,  (zugl. Dissertation, Universität Karlsruhe 1990).